National nature reserves in Bedfordshire, England are established by Natural England and managed by them or by non-governmental organisations such as the Royal Society for the Protection of Birds or the National Trust.

List of reserves 
A list of national nature reserves in Bedfordshire:
 Barton Hills, 44 Ha in the Chiltern Hills.
 King's Wood, Heath and Reach, 63 Ha near Woburn.
 Knocking Hoe, 7.7 Ha of grassland near Hitchin.

References 

 Bedfordshire
Nature reserves in Bedfordshire